Ian Nicholas McCave (born 3 February 1941) is a British geologist, who was the Woodwardian Professor of Geology at the University of Cambridge Department of Earth Sciences from 1985 to 2008 and a fellow of St John's College from 1986 to present . His current research topic is "The Sediment Record of the Deep-Sea Circulation" in the area of "Environmental change and marine geochemistry". He is primarily a marine sedimentologist.

Education
He was educated at Elizabeth College, Guernsey, Hertford College, Oxford and Brown University (PhD).

Research Summary
Seventy percent of the Earth is covered by water, so information about the marine environment is vital in understanding how the Earth's surface system works. Nick McCave's research looks at perturbations in the deep oceans, using evidence from micro-fossils combined with carbon dating, to obtain information on pre-historical climate change. It is important to understand the normal cycles of climate change, in order to assess the degree to which the global warming we are experiencing now is caused by man, and the likely consequences by analysis of past analogues. One problem is the interaction between atmospheric climate change and the observed changes in the ocean currents. There is a 'chicken and egg' question: are the perturbations seen in atmospheric CO2 concentrations forced by the vigour of the deep ocean currents, or vice versa?

McCave uses monitoring points in the North Atlantic Ocean, Pacific Ocean and Indian Ocean to study how the Earth’s meridional heat flux is distributed by warm surface-ocean currents and cold deep-ocean currents.

Research Groups

 Glaciology and Quaternary Science research cluster
 Godwin Laboratory for Palaeoclimate Research

Selected Biography 

 1969 - 1985: Lecturer (until 1976), Reader (until 1985) at the University of East Anglia School of Environmental Sciences
 1978 - 1999: Adjunct Scientist (until 1987), Guest Investigator (1999) at Woods Hole Oceanographic Institution
 1988 - 1998: Head of the Department of Earth Sciences, University of Cambridge
 1985 - 2008: Woodwardian Professor of Geology, University of Cambridge

Other Professional Activities 
 1992 -1996: President of the Scientific Committee on Oceanic Research (SCOR) of the International Council for Science (ICSU).
 2003 - 05: Member of the Steering Committee for NERC's Rapid Climate Change programme
 2001 and 2008: Member of the UK Research Assessment Exercise panels for Earth and Environmental Sciences

References

External links 
 Personal web page at the Department of Earth Sciences, University of Cambridge
 Cambridge Environmental Initiative

1941 births
Living people
People educated at Elizabeth College, Guernsey
Alumni of Hertford College, Oxford
Brown University alumni
British geologists
Academics of the University of East Anglia
Fellows of St John's College, Cambridge
Lyell Medal winners
Woodwardian Professors of Geology